Daniel Jacob Stern (born August 28, 1957) is an American actor, artist, director, and screenwriter. He is perhaps best known for his roles as Marv Merchants in Home Alone (1990) and Home Alone 2: Lost in New York (1992), Phil Berquist in City Slickers (1991) and City Slickers II: The Legend of Curly's Gold (1994), the voice of adult Kevin Arnold on the television series The Wonder Years, and the voice of Dilbert on the animated series of the same name. Other notable films of his include Breaking Away (1979), Stardust Memories (1980), Diner (1982), Blue Thunder (1983), Hannah and Her Sisters (1986), The Milagro Beanfield War (1988), Coupe de Ville (1990), and Very Bad Things (1998). He made his feature-film directorial debut with Rookie of the Year (1993).

Early life
Stern was born in Bethesda, Maryland to Cynthia and Leonard Stern. His father was a social worker while his mother managed a day care center. He is Jewish. His brother is television writer David M. Stern. During his years at Bethesda-Chevy Chase High School, Stern starred in several theater productions, including playing C.C. Baxter in Promises, Promises and Tevye in Fiddler on the Roof. Stern applied for a job as a lighting engineer for a Shakespeare Festival in Washington, D.C., but was hired as a walk-on in their production of The Taming of the Shrew, starring Glenn Close. He dropped out of high school in his senior year and soon moved to New York. After taking acting lessons at HB Studio with Austin Pendleton and Herbert Berghof, Stern began his acting career in Off Broadway and Broadway productions, including True West with Gary Sinise and How I Got That Story at Second Stage Theatre with Bob Gunton. He acted in numerous productions at The Public Theater, Ensemble Studio Theater, Cherry Lane Theater, and Manhattan Theater Club.

Career

In 1979, Stern made his film debut as Cyril in Breaking Away. The following year he played a student who raised objections during Jill Clayburgh's proof of the snake lemma in the film It's My Turn. He was the novice observer Richard Lymangood in the 1983 action thriller film Blue Thunder. He had another early film role in the 1984 horror film C.H.U.D., as the soup kitchen C.H.U.D. hunter. His breakthrough role as Laurence "Shrevie" Schreiber came in Barry Levinson's Diner. He appeared in two films with Woody Allen, Stardust Memories and Hannah and Her Sisters.

Stern has played characters in a number of comedic roles, such as Phil Berquist in City Slickers and City Slickers II: The Legend of Curly's Gold, and Marv the burglar in the first two Home Alone films, Home Alone and Home Alone 2: Lost in New York, with Joe Pesci. However, he declined to play the character once again in the fourth installment of the franchise, believing the script to be an insult to the original motion picture. He also starred as Max in Bushwhacked. He provided the voice of the narrator on the TV series The Wonder Years, which starred Fred Savage as Kevin Arnold. As narrator, Stern played the adult Kevin Arnold, remembering his youth. Stern and Savage were also featured together in Little Monsters, in which Stern played the father of Savage's character. In the late 1990s, Stern took on a more serious role in the black comedy Very Bad Things with Christian Slater, Cameron Diaz and Jon Favreau. Stern provided the voice for the main character of the Dilbert animated TV series, based on the comic strip by Scott Adams.

Stern directed several episodes of The Wonder Years and the 1993 feature film Rookie of the Year, and in recent years directed two episodes of the TV series, Manhattan.

Stern created, wrote, and starred in the CBS television show Danny.

He wrote the off-Broadway hit Barbra's Wedding, which was produced by The Dodgers and Manhattan Theater Club. It starred John Pankow and Julie White and ran for six months. Stern also appeared in the play at Garry Marshall's Falcon Theater.

Stern was originally offered the role of Dale Gribble in King of the Hill but he was replaced by Johnny Hardwick when his salary agreement went low. He starred in Game Over, Man! (2018) as well as the Hulu original series, “Shrill”, as the main character’s (Aidy Bryant) father.

Personal life
Stern works as an artist, specializing in bronze sculpture. He has created sculptures for public art projects in San Diego, Pasadena, Palm Desert, Temple City, Monrovia, and Agoura Hills. He is an artist in residence at Studio Channel Islands Art Centre in Camarillo. He has also done many private commissions, gallery exhibitions and art fairs. He married actress Laure Mattos in 1980, and together they have three children, son California State Senator Henry Stern and daughters Ella and Sophie Stern.

Filmography

Film

Television

Awards and nominations

References

External links

Iceboxx - Webblog about Daniel Stern's artwork

1957 births
Living people
20th-century American Jews
20th-century American male actors
21st-century American Jews
21st-century American male actors
American male film actors
American male screenwriters
American male television actors
American male television writers
American male voice actors
American television directors
American television writers
Bethesda-Chevy Chase High School alumni
Film directors from Maryland
Jewish American male actors
Male actors from Maryland
People from Bethesda, Maryland
Screenwriters from Maryland